Heidi Viljanen (born 18 August 1980 in Kankaanpää) is a Finnish politician currently serving in the Parliament of Finland for the Social Democratic Party of Finland at the Satakunta constituency.

References

1980 births
Living people
People from Kankaanpää
Social Democratic Party of Finland politicians
Members of the Parliament of Finland (2019–23)
21st-century Finnish women politicians
Women members of the Parliament of Finland